Daniel E. Gorenstein (January 1, 1923 – August 26, 1992) was an American mathematician. He earned his undergraduate and graduate degrees at Harvard University, where he earned his Ph.D. in 1950 under Oscar Zariski, introducing in his dissertation a duality principle for plane curves that motivated Grothendieck's introduction of  Gorenstein rings. He was a major influence on the classification of finite simple groups.

After teaching mathematics to military personnel at Harvard before earning his doctorate, Gorenstein held posts at Clark University and Northeastern University before he began teaching at Rutgers University in 1969, where he remained for the rest of his life. He was the founding director of DIMACS in 1989, and remained as its director until his death.

Gorenstein was awarded many honors for his work on finite simple groups. He was recognised, in addition to his own research contributions such as work on signalizer functors, as a leader in directing the classification proof, one of the largest collaborative pieces of pure mathematics ever attempted.  In 1972 he was a Guggenheim Fellow and a Fulbright Scholar; in 1978 he gained membership in the National Academy of Sciences and the American Academy of Arts and Sciences, and in 1989 won the Steele Prize for mathematical exposition.

See also

Gorenstein–Harada theorem
Gorenstein–Walter theorem
Peterson–Gorenstein–Zierler algorithm

Notes

External links
 
 
 Obituary: Professor Daniel Gorenstein
 Daniel Gorenstein, 1923-1992 - A Biographical Memoir by Michael Aschbacher

20th-century American mathematicians
1923 births
1992 deaths
Group theorists
Harvard University alumni
Rutgers University faculty
Members of the United States National Academy of Sciences